The Kandalama Reservoir (also erroneously known as the Kandalama Lake) is a reservoir in Kandalama, Sri Lanka. Water from the dam is used for irrigation purposes in the region, extending up to Kekirawa. The tank was created by constructing a dam across one of the main tributaries of Kala Wewa - the Mirisgoniya River. During 1952 to 1957, the tank was rehabilitated by Department of Irrigation of Sri Lanka. The reservoir and hotel is situated with the Kaludiya Pokuna Forest archeological site.

Due to its scenic surroundings, and year-round water availability, the reservoir is a very popular tourist destination in Sri Lanka.

See also 

 List of dams and reservoirs in Sri Lanka

References

External links 
 

Reservoirs in Sri Lanka
Bodies of water of Matale District
Buildings and structures in Matale District
Lakes of Sri Lanka